Bernhard Havestadt (b. at Cologne, 27 February 1714; died at Münster 1781) was a German Jesuit missionary in Chile.

Life
He entered the Lower-Rhenish province of the order on 20 October 1732, and in 1746 went to Chile. He was one of the 102 German Jesuits in the Chilean mission between 1720-67. His 20 years in the country were spent mostly among the Araucanian Indians.

Works

A gifted linguist, knowing nine languages, he took up the study of Chilidugu. In his opinion, it "towered over all other languages as the Andes over all other mountains". The result of these studies appeared in "Chilidúǵu, sive Res Chilenses, vel descriptio, status tum naturalis, tum civilis, cum moralis regni populique Chilensis, inserta suis, locis perfectæ ad Chilensem linguam manuductioni etc." (3 vols., Münster, 1777), written in Germany after the expulsion of the Jesuits from the Spanish colonies. It had been originally composed in Spanish, and was now issued in Latin. Besides a grammar and dictionary, it includes copious specimens of the native Chilean tongue, hymns, and valuable ethnographic notes, etc.

The work was re-issued in two volumes by the well-known student of American languages Dr. Julius Platzmann (Leipzig, 1883), under its original title, "Chilidúǵu sive tractatus linguæ Chilensis" (see Zarncke, "Literar. Centralblatt", 1883, col. 693).

References
Attribution
 The entry cites:
Huonder, Deutsche Jesuitenmissionäre (Freiburg im Br., 1899), 133; 
von Murr, journal (Nuremberg, 1776–90), I, 122 sqq.: 
, Nachrichten aus verschiedenen Ländern der spanischen Amerika, II (Halle, 1810), 431 sqq.; 
Adelung und Vater, Mithridates (Berlin, 1806–17), III, 2, 404; 
Enrich, Hist. de la Comp. de Jésus en Chile, II (Barcelona, 1891), 213, 294, 352, and elsewhere; 
Zwölf Missionsspredigten ... durch den Wolchrw. Herrn. Bernhardt Havestadt, chemaligen Missionarium aus der Gesell. Jesu (Cologne, 1778), which contains some bibliographical information.

1714 births
18th-century German Jesuits
Jesuit missionaries in Chile
1781 deaths
German Roman Catholic missionaries
Linguists from Germany
Missionary linguists
German expatriates in Chile
Linguists of Mapuche